Balkasar Interchange is an interchange on Motorway M2 in Chakwal District. It is the oldest interchange in the district. It exits the M2 at Talagang Chakwal Road. The interchange was constructed to resolve traffic congestion issues from Balkassar Interchange to Tehada. The project was started on December 11, 2010 and was completed on September 30, 2011, incurring a total cost of PKR 305 million as quoted by the contractor of the project i.e. Habib Construction Services.

Location 
It is situated between the Kallar Kahar Interchange and Neelah Dullah Interchange on the M2. At the exit of M2 on Talagang Chakwal Road, Talagang is at a distance of 28 km while Chakwal is located at a distance of 17 km.

See also
Chakwal Police And Rescue Departements
Tourism in Chakwal
Neelah Dullah Interchange
Kallar Kahar Interchange
Chakwal Transport System

Road interchanges in Pakistan